Luncoiu de Jos is a commune in Hunedoara County, Transylvania, Romania. It is composed of five villages: Dudești (Dudesd), Luncoiu de Jos, Luncoiu de Sus (Felsőlunkoj), Podele and Stejărel (Szkrófa).

References

Communes in Hunedoara County
Localities in Transylvania